Elections to Isle of Wight Council took place on 6 May 2021 as part of the 2021 United Kingdom local elections. These were held at the same time as the elections for the Hampshire Police and Crime Commissioner. The elections saw the Conservatives lose control of the council, losing seats against the national trend for the party.

Results summary

Background 
New ward divisions were used for this election, with thirty wards changing, with the number of wards reduced by one to 39 single-member seats. In the previous election, the Conservatives had won a majority with twenty five seats, with Independents (including the Island Independent Group), Liberal Democrats, Greens, and Labour also winning seats.

For the 2021 election, as well as existing independent candidates, the new Our Island also announced its intention to support several independent candidates.

Aftermath 
The incumbent Conservative leader of the council lost his seat to the Green Party, and was replaced as group leader by Steve Hastings, who subsequently invited other councillors to coalition talks.

On 26 May, independent councillor Lora Peacey-Wilcox was elected leader of the council with 20 votes to Hastings’s 18. There was a single abstention from the Labour councillor, who was absent. Island Independent Network councillor Ian Stephens was elected her deputy. Independent councillor Geoff Brodie was elected as the Chair of the Council, with Green councillor Claire Critchison elected Vice-Chair.

The leadership and cabinet - termed the "Alliance Group" - includes Independent, Green, Island Independent Network and Our Island councillors who together make up 18 of the 39 seats on the council. With the additional external support from the Liberal Democrats and the Vectis Party this constitutes a majority of 20 out of the 39 council seats.

In August 2021, Cllr Brodie quit the Alliance Group over planning issues, but continues to support the administration.

Division results

Bembridge

Binstead and Fishbourne

Brading and St Helens

Brighstone, Calbourne and Shalfleet

Carisbrooke and Gunville

Central Rural

Chale, Niton and Shorwell

Cowes Medina

Cowes North

Cowes South and Northwood

Cowes West and Gurnard

East Cowes

Fairlee and Whippingham

Freshwater North and Yarmouth

Freshwater South

Haylands and Swanmore

Lake North

Lake South

Mountjoy and Shide

Nettlestone and Seaview

Newchurch, Havenstreet and Ashey

Newport Central

Newport West

Osborne

Pan and Barton

Parkhurst and Hunnyhill

Ryde Appley and Elmfield

Ryde Monktonmead

Ryde North West

Ryde South East

Ryde West

Sandown North

Sandown South

Shanklin Central

Shanklin South

Totland and Colwell

Ventnor and St Lawrence

Wootton Bridge

Wroxall, Lowtherville and Bonchurch

References 

Isle of Wight
Isle of Wight Council elections
21st century on the Isle of Wight